Leptopharsa is a genus of lace bugs in the family Tingidae. There are more than 120 described species in Leptopharsa.

See also
 List of Leptopharsa species

References

Further reading

 
 
 
 

Tingidae
Articles created by Qbugbot